Usmanskiye Vyselki is a rural locality (a selo) in Krasnolimanskoye Rural Settlement, Paninsky District, Voronezh Oblast, Russia. The population was 91 as of 2010. There are 2 streets.

Geography 
Usmanskiye Vyselki is located 47 km southwest of Panino (the district's administrative centre) by road. Pavlovka is the nearest rural locality.

References 

Rural localities in Paninsky District